The United Kingdom Literacy Association (UKLA) is a registered charity in the United Kingdom which aims to promote good practice and raise standards in literacy.  It was founded in 1963 as the United Kingdom Reading Association, but changed its name in 2003.
Wiley-Blackwell publishes a journal entitled Journal of Research in Reading on behalf of the UKLA.

The UKLA organizes the UKLA Book Awards for children's books. It is judged by teachers.

UKLA Book Awards winners

2020
 11 to 14+ category: No Fixed Address by Susin Nielsen
 7 to 11 category: The Eleventh Trade by Alyssa Hollingsworth
 3 to 6 category: Mixed, written and illustrated by Arree Chung
 Information Books category: Counting on Katherine, written by Helaine Becker and illustrated by Dow Phumiruk

2019
 12 to 16+ category: Long Way Down by Jason Reynolds, illustrated by Chris Priestley
 7 to 11 category: The Explorer by Katherine Rundell, illustrated by Hannah Horn
 3 to 6 category: I am Bat, written and illustrated by Morag Hood

2018
 12 to 16+ category: We Come Apart by Sarah Crossan and Brian Conaghan
 7 to 11 category, joint winner: Welcome to Nowhere written by Elizabeth Laird and illustrated by Lucy Eldridge
 7 to 11 category, joint winner: Lesser Spotted Animals written and illustrated by Martin Brown
 3 to 6 category: Colin and Lee Carrot and Pea written and illustrated by Morag Hood

2017
 12 to 16+ category: The Reluctant Journal of Henry K. Larsen by Susin Nielsen
 7 to 11 category: The Journey written and illustrated by Francesca Sanna
 3 to 6 category: There's a Bear on MY Chair by Ross Collins

2016
 12 to 16+ category: The Lie Tree by Frances Hardinge
 7 to 11 category: The Imaginary by A. F. Harrold and Emily Gravett
 3 to 6 category: Little Red and the Very Hungry Lion by Alex T. Smith

2015
 12 to 16+ category: Every Day by David Levithan
 7 to 11 category: Oliver and the Seawigs by Philip Reeve and Sarah McIntyre
 3 to 6 category: The Day the Crayons Quit written by Drew Daywalt and illustrated by Oliver Jeffers

2014
 12 to 16 category: Now is the Time for Running by Michael Williams
 7 to 11 category: The Story of the Blue Planet by Andri Snær Magnason, Julian Meldon D'Arcy (translator), Áslaug Jónsdóttir (illustrator)
 3 to 6 category: This is Not My Hat by Jon Klassen

2013
 12 to 16 category: Code Name Verity by Elizabeth Wein
 7 to 11 category: The Weight of Water by Sarah Crossan
 3 to 6 category: Good Little Wolf by Nadia Shireen Rayner

2012
 12 to 16 category: A Monster Calls by Patrick Ness, illustrated by Jim Kay
 7 to 11 category: Sky Hawk by Gill Lewis
 3 to 6 category: Iris & Isaac by Catherine Rayner

2011
 12 to 16 category: Out of Shadows by Jason Wallace
 3 to 11 category: Birdsong by Ellie Sandall

2010
 12 to 16 category:  The Graveyard Book by Neil Gaiman and Chris Riddell (illustrator)
 3 to 11 category: Then by Morris Gleitzman

2009
 12 to 16 category: Bog Child by Siobhan Dowd
 3 to 11 category: Archie's War by Marcia Williams

2008
 Picture book category: Penguin by Polly Dunbar
 Novel category: Here Lies Arthur by Philip Reeve

References

External links

Official website

British literature
Educational charities based in the United Kingdom
Organizations established in 1963
1963 establishments in the United Kingdom